is a 1974 Japanese film based on the Soviet Union's invasion of Karafuto during the Soviet–Japanese War near the end of World War II. The movie is set in Maoka (present day Kholmsk), and the story is based on the deaths of nine women who worked in the postal telegraph office in the city. Twelve women worked in the office, and on August 20, 1945, nine of them committed suicide.

Plot 
The film is set in Karafuto after the radio broadcast of the Imperial Rescript on the Termination of the War. On August 15, 1945, Soviet forces invaded Karafuto. On August 20, the postal telegraph office in Maoka suspended operations and nine of the twelve telephone operators committed suicide by taking potassium cyanide while the city was being invaded.

Pressure by the USSR 
Despite the film's release in many nations, including the Soviet Union, Moscow argued that the film defamed the Soviet Union and the Soviet people and would only make people more hostile towards the USSR. The movie was eventually banned in the Soviet Union after two weeks' distribution in Hokkaidō and western Kyūshū. On August 25, 2008, a Japanese television drama was aired called Kiri no Hi, which was based on the same historical events. However, the television drama caused less of a political uproar from Russia than Karafuto 1945 Summer Hyosetsu no Mon, due to the movie's insistence as a work of "fiction" and because it did not focus on the Red Army's brutal actions but instead talked about a wish for world peace.

Re-release 
On July 17, 2010, when the film was almost 36 years old, it was released in various theatres worldwide.

Original cast 
 Terumi Niki as Ritsuko Sekine
 Yumiko Fujita as Ayako Sakamoto
 Kawai Okada as Natsuko Saito
 Keiko Torii as Nobue Fujikura
 Keiko Nomura as Yumi Sihida
 Nishiki Imadegawa as Keiko Torigai
 Takako Yagi as Masako Horie
 Fusako Aihara as Takako Kanzaki
 Kaoru Kiryū as Sumiko Aoki
 Mari Okamoto as Tomoko Katori
 Midori Kiuchi as Yayoi Nakamura
 Yōko Minamida as Husae Yasukawa
 Takahiro Tamura as Norio Yasukawa
 Gō Wakabayashi as Tadao Hisamitsu
 Hiromi Kurita as Mihoko Sugawara
 Shinichirō Mikami as Captain Yoshizaki
 Shōgo Shimada as Division Commander
 Shin Kishida as Military Commander
 Kenji Sahara as Toshikazu Okaya
 Mitsuo Hamada as Kiyoharu Nakanishi
 Yukiko Okada as Akiko Saitou
 Masao Imafuku as Tatsuzou Sekine
 Harue Akagi as Shizu Sekine
 Reiko Nanao as Kin Morimoto
 Tetsurō Tamba as Chief of staff
 Junkichi Orimoto as Kanzaki Yuichi
 Ichirō Izawa as Ryousuke Huzikura
 Toshio Kurosawa as Muraguchi
 Jūkei Fujioka as Regimental Commander Shimizu
 Minoru Chiaki as Planter
 Tetsu Mizuno as Osamu

See also 
 Kiri no Hi
 Evacuation of Karafuto and Kuriles
 Soviet–Japanese War

References

External links 
  
 Karafuto 1945 Summer Hyosetsu no Mon at Internet Movie Database

1974 films
Japanese war drama films
Films set in 1945
Japanese World War II films
Japan–Soviet Union relations
Films set in Sakhalin